The Scout and Guide movement in Lebanon is served by
 Fédération Libanaise des Eclaireuses et des Guides, member of the World Association of Girl Guides and Girl Scouts
 Lebanese Scouting Federation, member of the World Organization of the Scout Movement
 Homenmen Beirut

Emblems

See also

 Imam al-Mahdi Scouts
 Muslim Scout Association (Lebanon)

External links
 Islamic Risala Scout Association